FIPI may stand for:

 Five Item Personality Inventory: see Big Five personality traits#Measurements
 Federation of Image Professionals International: see Personal stylist
 Federation of Indian Petroleum Industry
 Forest Investigation and Planning Institute of Vietnam